Florencio Urot (1904 – November 19, 1975) was a Filipino politician and lawyer who served as the mayor of Cebu City from September to December 1971. Prior to becoming mayor, he served as a member of the Cebu City Council from 1940 to 1971.

Urot was born in Tabogon, Cebu. He later became a police chief of his town and pursued a law degree in college. After which, he moved to Cebu City where he was later elected as a member of the city council on December 10, 1940 along with seven other members. He went on to serve as city councilor for 35 years.

As then mayor Eulogio Borres and his vice mayor had to resign from their respective positions as both sought other elective positions, Urot as first-ranked councilor became mayor on September 13, 1971 and served for 108 days until December 31, 1971.

Urot died on November 19, 1975. Less than a year from his death, the city council on June 14, 1976 enacted City Ordinance No. 941 renaming 8th Street in Cebu North Reclamation Area as Florencio Urot Street. A school in Mabolo, Cebu City was also named as Florencio Urot Memorial National High School by virtue of City Ordinance No. 1180 which was approved by then mayor Ronald Duterte on December 27, 1984. However, the school was renamed in 2010 into Mabolo National High School.

References 

|-

1904 births
1975 deaths
Cebuano people
Mayors of Cebu City
Filipino police chiefs
Cebu City Council members